England has a long tradition of ecclesiastical heraldry. An Anglican bishopric is considered a corporation sole, and most have been granted official arms. Incumbents may impale their personal arms with those of their see.

Province of Canterbury

Province of York

Former dioceses

References

Church of England
Armorials of the United Kingdom